Goldfish are fish-shaped crackers with a small imprint of an eye and a smile manufactured by Pepperidge Farm, which is a division of the Campbell Soup Company. The brand's current marketing and product packaging incorporate this feature of the product: "The Snack That Smiles Back! Goldfish!", reinforced by Finn, the smiling mascot with sunglasses. The product is marketed as a "baked snack cracker" on the label with various flavors and varieties.

History
Originally invented by Oscar J. Kambly at Swiss biscuit manufacturer Kambly in 1958 to celebrate his wife who was a Pisces, Goldfish snacks were introduced to the United States in 1962 by Pepperidge Farm founder Margaret Rudkin.

Flavors
Goldfish come in many varieties, but start/end dates of availability are unknown:

 Original, also known as Saltine.
 Cheddar
 Whole Grain Cheddar
 Parmesan
 Pretzel
 Pizza
 Baby (Cheddar)
 Grahams (Vanilla Cupcake, Fudge Brownie, and S'mores)
 Flavor Blasted (Xtra Cheddar, Cheddar & Sour Cream, Cheddar Jack'd, Sour Cream & Onion, White Cheddar, Xtra Cheesy Pizza)
 Mix
 Frank's RedHot
 Jalapeno Popper

Different shapes and colors
These different-shaped Goldfish are all cheddar flavored. There are also different Goldfish mixtures, which are two flavors combined.

 Colors (same shape as original but different colors using natural colors, Colors: Yellow, orange, red and green)
 Princess (colored pink)
 Mickey Mouse (red crackers in shape of Mickey's head)
 Mega Bites (bigger than the original)
 Star Wars

Discontinued products

 PhysEdibles – prepared using whole-grains
 Puffs – launched in the United States in 2013 
 Giant Sandwich Crackers
 Giant Goldfish 
 Sandwich Snackers
 Garden Cheddar
 Mac & Cheese
 Cars 3 (red crackers in the shape of Lightning McQueen)
 Flavor Blasted Grahams
 Cinabuddy Snack Bites

International distribution

Goldfish are exported and sold in countries around the world. In the UK, they are sold under the name "Finz", but the product is identical. In Switzerland, the original Goldfish flavor is marketed under the brand name Goldfischli.

Goldfish was also sold in Australia under Arnott's branding, Canada and Hong Kong.

Spin-offs
Pepperidge Farm has created several spin-off products including Goldfish Sandwich Crackers, Flavor-Blasted Goldfish, Goldfish bread, multi-colored Goldfish (known as Goldfish-American), and Baby Goldfish (which are smaller than normal). There are also seasonably available color-changing Goldfish, colored Goldfish (come in a variety pack). There was reportedly once a line of Goldfish cookies in vanilla and chocolate; chocolate has reappeared in the "100 calorie" packs.

Goldfish noodles also can be found in Campbell's chicken noodle, tomato, and meatball soup. The Goldfish shaped noodles in the tomato soup have been discontinued.

Legal issues
In 1999, Campbell Soup Co.'s Pepperidge Farm won a court case involving Nabisco's Cheese Nips CatDog crackers that had fish-shaped crackers that resembled Goldfish. The court ordered Nabisco to refrain from using the goldfish shape and to recall all their products that included the fish shape.

Recalls
On July 23, 2018, Pepperidge Farm was notified by one of its ingredient suppliers that whey powder (in a seasoning applied to four varieties of Goldfish crackers) may have the presence of salmonella. The Flavored Blasted Xtra Cheddar crackers were recalled due to a possible risk of the salmonella outbreak. Three other Goldfish varieties (Flavored Blast Sour Slammin' Cream and Onion, Whole Grain Xtra Cheddar, and Goldfish Mix Xtra Cheddar and Pretzel) were also recalled due to contamination of the salmonella bacterium caused by the same affected whey powder used in The Flavored Blasted Xtra Cheddar GoldFish crackers. The contaminated varieties of Goldfish were immediately removed from all stores they were sold at following the recall.

In popular culture 
Julia Child liked Goldfish crackers so much, that on Thanksgiving, she often put out a bowl, alongside her famous reverse martini.

In Season 1, Episode 9 of The West Wing, character Danny Concannon gives C. J. Cregg a pet goldfish after misunderstanding a comment about C.J.'s affinity for the crackers.

See also

 List of crackers

Further reading

References

External links

 

Brand name crackers
Campbell Soup Company brands
Products introduced in 1958
American snack foods
Goldfish in culture